Castelnuovo is a  of the  of Assisi in the Province of Perugia, Umbria, central Italy.
Castelnuovo is situated about 9 km from Assisi and is located in the southwest of Santa Maria degli Angeli. Is surrounded also with the territories of other 2 fractions Assisi: Tordandrea to the west, and Rivotorto to the east.

It stands at an elevation of 195 metres above sea level. At the time of the Istat census of 2001 it had 754 inhabitants.

The most important watercourse is the river Ose, which basically it specify the frontier between Castelnuovo and Cannara.

References 

Castles in Italy
Frazioni of Assisi